Bieliński (feminine: Bielińska; plural: Bielińscy) is a Polish-language surname. Its Russified form is Belinsky.

People 
Daniel Bieliński (fl. 1570s), member of the Polish Brethren
Franciszek Bieliński (1683–1766), Polish statesman
Halina Bielińska (1914–1989), Polish director
Paweł Bieliński, President of Warsaw

See also
Fabián Bielinsky (1959-2006), Argentine director

Polish-language surnames